Royston Edward Dwight (9 January 1933 – 9 April 2002) was an English footballer. He scored the opening goal in the 1959 FA Cup Final for Nottingham Forest.

Career

Fulham
Although a winger, he was renowned for his shooting ability. Dwight scored 54 goals in 72 games for Fulham between 1954 and 1958, including a hat-trick against Liverpool in 1956. In 1957, he was in the London XI that beat Lausanne Sport 2–0 in the semi-final second leg of the Inter-Cities Fairs Cup at Highbury.

Nottingham Forest
He moved on to Nottingham Forest in the summer of 1958 for a 'substantial' fee, reported as £10,000. In 1958–59, his only full season at Nottingham Forest, Dwight scored 26 goals in 41 League and 9 FA Cup appearances, including two hat-tricks. He opened the scoring after 10 minutes for Forest in the 1959 FA Cup Final against Luton Town. After 33 minutes, with Forest winning 2–0, Dwight was carried off the Wembley pitch after breaking his leg in a tackle with Luton's Brendan McNally. Ten-man Forest held on, winning the match 2–1 to become the only team reduced in numbers by injury to win the trophy.

Despite scoring in his comeback game the following March, he was not the player he had been before his injury. He played only twice more for Forest before dropping out of League football.

Later career
He moved back to play in his native Kent with Gravesend and Northfleet. He returned to league football with spells at Coventry City and Millwall.

He later managed Tooting and Mitcham, who had been Forest's 3rd round opponents in their winning FA Cup run in 1959, and also managed Dartford.

Career outside football
Later in life during the 1970s he taught Physical Education at Forest Hill Boys Secondary School. He took up a position of Assistant Racing Manager in the greyhound racing industry at Catford Stadium and later Crayford & Bexleyheath Stadium.

Personal life
When he was eight, Roy's mother died in childbirth while giving birth to his sister Susan, and following his father's death, he moved in with his grandparents.

He married Constance Carver in Dartford in 1954, and was the cousin of singer Sir Elton John (real name Reg Dwight); Roy's father Edwin and Sir Elton's father Stanley were brothers.

Roy Dwight died in London in 2002 at the age of 69.

Notes

1933 births
2002 deaths
Fulham F.C. players
Nottingham Forest F.C. players
Coventry City F.C. players
Millwall F.C. players
Footballers from Belvedere, London
English Football League players
London XI players
Association football wingers
English footballers
Schoolteachers from London
Ebbsfleet United F.C. players
People in greyhound racing
FA Cup Final players